Oronsay, also sometimes spelt and pronounced Oransay by the local community, is a small tidal island south of Colonsay in the Scottish Inner Hebrides with an area of .

In the 2001 census Oronsay was recorded as having a population of five people, who lived at the farm adjacent to Oronsay Priory. In 2011 the population had risen to eight. The island has no facilities for visitors and is now privately owned, with the RSPB farming the island for the American owner. It is dependent upon tidal access to and from Colonsay. There is a small grass air strip south of the priory that "fights a losing battle with the rabbits".

Etymology
There are two theories for the origin of the name from Old Norse. Either it is Oran's Isle, St Oran being imagined as the founder of the island's original monastery in 563, (Murray (1966) states that the original Gaelic name was Eilean Orain) or it may be from the Old Norse Örfirisey meaning "island of the ebb tide".

Prehistory
Both Oronsay and neighbouring Colonsay have furnished archaeologists with invaluable information about the Mesolithic period of prehistory, particularly about the diet of human beings. Three middens on Oronsay were opened in the 1880s and have provided a piece of bone carbon-dated to 4600 BC and an oyster shell to 3065 BC. Evidence provided from saithe bones in the middens suggest that the local population lived there all year round and were heavily reliant on marine protein. Site datings on Colonsay and Islay suggest an absence of human habitation in the area from  5250–4750 BC for unknown reasons.

There is comparatively little evidence for life during the Neolithic and Bronze Ages although a picture emerges of "small farming communities and changes in technology occurring slowly over a long period of time" on Colonsay and environs. By the close of the Iron Age around 500 AD Colonsay and Oronsay were part of the Gaelic-speaking Kingdom of Dál Riata although which of the main Dalriadan kindreds controlled them is unknown. The founding of the fort of Dùn Eibhinn on Colonsay that overlooks Oronsay dates from this period.

Religious history

Watson (2004) mentions Oronsay as a possible candidate for the site of Hinba, an island in Scotland of uncertain location that was the site of a small monastery associated with the Columban church on Iona.

The site of a Norse ship burial has been found on Oronsay and another on Colonsay dated to the mid 9th century at which point these islands were likely part of the far-flung Kingdom of the Isles. Following the 1266 Treaty of Perth the Hebrides were yielded to the Kingdom of Scotland and the Gaelic language re-asserted its dominant position in the southern Hebrides.

Oronsay also had a medieval Augustinian priory, the ruins of which are still extant. It was built  1380, possibly on the site of an earlier church (for whose existence there is actually no surviving evidence), perhaps founded by John of Islay, Lord of the Isles. By the early 16th century a distinct 'school' of monumental sculpture flourished on Oronsay. Two substantial celtic crosses sit outside the perimeter of the buildings and many slabs with effigies or other carvings are still to be found within the priory itself.

16th-18th centuries

On a visit to Colonsay in the 18th century, Sir Joseph Banks was informed that Murchardus Macdufie (d. 1539) "was a factor or manager for Macdonald King of the Isles upon these islands of Oransay and Colonsay & that for his mismanagement & tyranny he was executed by order of that prince".

According to Caldwell (2011) "the medieval period on Islay, Jura and Colonsay was a cultural high point" but the last known Prior of Oronsay was Robert Lamont, elected in 1555. After the Scottish Reformation in 1560, the lands and property of the priory was given in commendam to Maol Choluim MacDubhthaich (Malcolm MacDuffie), at which time it would appear that the community ceased to exist. The MacDuffies based their operations at the site of the old Dalriadan fort of Dun Eibhinn.

Writing in 1549, Sir Donald Monro, High Dean of the Isles stated of "Orvansay" that it was a low-lying island with "ane Monasterie of Channonis" and "full of hares and polecats, with a good anchorage for Highland galleys and shallow waters". In 1596 a report about the military strength of the Lords of the Isles indicated that Colonsay and Oronsay together maintained a contingent of 100 warriors who were not required to work the land.

By the early 17th century land on Colonsay was held by both Clan Macfie and Clan MacDonald of Dunnyveg. In 1623 Coll Ciotach (Colkitto), a Dunnyveg mercenary, was charged with the murder of Malcolm MacFie. MacFie had been hiding on Eilean nan Ròn (an islet south-west of Oronsay) but he was spotted there by Colkitto's men, apprehended and then tied to a stone and summarily shot. However, after the death of their chief, the MacFies lost control of their lands and by 1630 Colkitto held the whole of Colonsay and Oronsay from the Campbell Earl of Argyll. However, not long after this Colkitto lost his own life in the Wars of the Three Kingdoms and by 1701 the Campbells had sold both islands to a MacNeill of Knapdale, whose family held these lands until the early 20th century.

Martin Martin observed in a 1703 publication that Oronsay:

The island is now owned by the Colburn family.

Wildlife
 
The rocks and skerries of Eilean nan Ròn (Seal Island), to the south-west, are an important grey seal breeding colony. The islet has a ruined house, possibly once used by a kelp gatherer and used for sheep grazing in the summer, the rocks being fertilised by the winter-visiting barnacle geese. Dean Munro also mentioned the nearby islet of Eilean Ghaoideamal under its earlier name of Ellan na muk, noting that it was "gude for swine and uther bestiall".

In order to conserve the population of resident choughs and breeding corncrakes  Oronsay and southern Colonsay became a Special Protection Area in December 2007.

Colonsay and Oronsay are home to about 50 colonies of the European dark bee the Apis mellifera mellifera. The Scottish Government introduced the Bee Keeping (Colonsay and Oronsay) Order 2013 to prevent cross breeding with other honeybees (Apis mellifera)  and to protect it from diseases common on the mainland. From 1 January 2014 it has been an offence to keep any other honeybee on either island. The Environment and climate Change Minister Paul Wheelhouse MSP said: "The Bee Keeping Order illustrates how our non-native species legislation can be used to protect our native wildlife. The order is a targeted measure to protect an important population of black bees on Colonsay from hybridisation with non-native bees" (the "non-native species legislation" was used because Apis mellifera are considered to be non-native to Colonsay, but considered native to Scotland as it was the first honey bee to be introduced for use in beekeeping there). The bees on Colonsay are now referred to as the "Colonsay Dark Native Bee". They were collected from across Scotland in the previous thirty years, genetic analysis has shown Australian and New Zealand A. m. ligustica introgression.

See also

 List of islands of Scotland

References and footnotes
Notes

Footnotes

General references
 
 
 

   First printed for Andrew Bell and others, London.
 
 
 Munro, R. W. (1961) Monro's Western Isles of Scotland and Genealogies of the Clans. Edinburgh and London. Oliver and Boyd.
 
 Murray, W.H. (1973) The Islands of Western Scotland: the Inner and Outer Hebrides. London. Eyre Methuen. 
 Omand, Donald (ed.) (2006) The Argyll Book. Edinburgh. Birlinn. 
 Watt, D.E.R. & Shead, N.F. (eds.) (2001) The Heads of Religious Houses in Scotland from the 12th to the 16th Centuries, The Scottish Records Society, New Series, Volume 24. Edinburgh.
 Watson, W.J. (2004) The History of the Celtic Place-names of Scotland. Reprinted with an introduction by Simon Taylor. Edinburgh. Birlinn. . First published 1926.

External links

  2005 article that  explores Columba's possible landing on Oronsay, the Priory and aspects of Oronsay life today.

Islands of Argyll and Bute
Islands of the Inner Hebrides
Sites of Special Scientific Interest in Islay and Jura
Tidal islands of Scotland